Ostrya rehderiana (Zhejiang hop-hornbeam) is a tree in the Betulaceae family. It is endemic to Zhejiang province in China. The wild population apparently consists of only five trees on Tianmu Mountain, and the species is under first-class national protection in China.

References

rehderiana
Endemic flora of China
Trees of China
Critically endangered plants
Taxonomy articles created by Polbot